Atractoceros albiciliata is a moth in the family Brachodidae. It was described by Walsingham in 1891. It is found in South Africa.

References

Natural History Museum Lepidoptera generic names catalog

Endemic moths of South Africa
Brachodidae
Moths described in 1891